Denzil Llewellyn Douglas (born 14 January 1953) is a Saint Kittitian and Nevisian politician and the longest-serving prime minister of Saint Kitts and Nevis, in office from 1995 to 2015. Subsequently he has been Leader of the Opposition. He was the leader of the Saint Kitts and Nevis Labour Party (SKNLP) from 1989 to 2021.

Biography

Early life and pre-political career
Born on 14 January 1953 in the village of St. Pauls, Douglas studied medicine as a young man. He obtained a Bachelor of Science degree in 1977 and a Degree in Medicine in 1984 from the University of the West Indies at Cave Hill. In 1986 he established a private medical practice as a family physician and served as President of the St. Kitts-Nevis Medical Association in the late 1980s.

Political life
Douglas was elected M.P. for St. Christopher (No.6) ward (Newton Ground, St. Paul's, Dieppe Bay, Saddlers, and Harris) in the National Assembly of Saint Kitts and Nevis in 1989 and appointed Leader of the Opposition. That year he was also elected leader of the Saint Kitts and Nevis Labour Party after some internal wrangling for the leadership between himself and the then incumbent political leader Sir Lee L Moore. This internal feud surfaced after Sir Lee L Moore had lost his seat in constituency number 4.

He restructured the party in preparation for its 1995 electoral victory. He was appointed Prime Minister of Saint Kitts and Nevis in 1995, re-appointed Prime Minister in March 2000 and again in October 2004 after the Labour Party won a third term with seven of the eight seats on St. Kitts. The Labour Party won its fourth consecutive term in office on 25 January 2010, winning six of the eight seats on St Kitts in the eleven-member National Assembly.

In 2011, Douglas was responsible for the OLPC (One Laptop per Child) program, which provided 2,000 free laptops per year from Taiwan to high school students.

Political Controversies 
In 2014, the Financial Crimes Enforcement Network (FinCEN) issued an Advisory to alert financial institutions that certain foreign individuals were abusing the Citizenship by Investment program sponsored by the Federation of St. Kitts and Nevis (SKN) led by the Denzil Douglas Administration to obtain SKN passports for the purpose of engaging in illicit financial activity. As a result of these lax controls, illicit actors, including individuals intending to use the secondary citizenship to evade sanctions, can obtain an SKN passport with relative ease. These events led to the United States revoking his visa.

Detainment at Gatwick Airport London 
On 16 November 2019, The Mail on Sunday reported Douglas was detained at Gatwick Airport by the UK's Border Force. The Officers seized the equivalent of more than £70,000 – in sterling, US dollars and eastern Caribbean dollars – from him  when he could not explain why he was attempting to leave the country with the cash. It was said he was the subject of a probe by the National Crime Agency.

Appeal court ruled that Denzil Douglas must vacate seat in Parliament

On Thursday 12 March 2020, the Government of St Kitts-Nevis Information Services SKNIS  reported in a Press release that The Eastern Caribbean Supreme Court (ECSC) of Appeal in Castries, Saint Lucia, in a judgment handed down on, March 12, 2020, ruled that Dr. Denzil Douglas, Leader of the St. Kitts and Nevis Opposition Labour Party and Parliamentary Representative for St. Christopher Six, must VACATE his seat in the National Assembly with immediate effect over the issue of a Dominican diplomatic passport that had been granted to him by Dominica. Chief Justice, the Hon. Dame Janice M. Pereira, made the following conclusion:

"The cumulative effect of my conclusions is that Dr. Douglas, by his application for, receipt and use of a Dominican diplomatic passport, placed him in clear breach of section 28(1)(a) of the Constitution. As a matter of law, the consequence in the terms of section 33(3)(c) follows. That consequence is that, Dr. Douglas is required to vacate his seat in the National Assembly in Saint Christopher and Nevis,”

Post-premiership

After losing the 2015 general election he remained active in politics as leader of the opposition.  Prior to the 2020 general election, Douglas had not put in place a succession plan for new leadership of the SKNLP despite calls to resign.

In 2021, Douglas decided to step down as leader of the SKNLP, while remaining the parliamentary leader of the opposition.  At the national SKNLP convention on 28 November 2021, party chairman Terrance Drew was elected as his successor.

On 15 August 2022 he joined the Drew ministry as Minister of Foreign Affairs.

Honours

Appointed to Her Majesty’s Privy Council, with the prefix "Right Honourable" added to his name (2011)
:
 Special Grand Cordon of the Order of Propitious Clouds (2011)

References

External link

1953 births
Living people
Members of the National Assembly (Saint Kitts and Nevis)
Members of the Privy Council of the United Kingdom
People from Saint Paul Capisterre Parish
Prime Ministers of Saint Kitts and Nevis
Finance ministers of Saint Kitts and Nevis
Saint Kitts and Nevis Labour Party politicians
University of the West Indies alumni
Foreign Ministers of Saint Kitts and Nevis